The Cathedral Basilica of the Assumption of the Blessed Virgin Mary simplified to Kielce Cathedral, is a Roman Catholic church that has the status of cathedral and basilica located in the city of Kielce in Poland. It is located in the "Castle Hill" in the heart of the city, next to the Palace of the Bishops of Kraków, also a famous landmark.

It was built during the 12th century by the Bishop of Kraków, Gedeon. It was destroyed by the tartars in 1260. Then, in 1719 Bishop Kazimierz Lubienski began to reconstruct the building in the early Baroque style that still characterizes it. Inside, the three ships have a variety of colors in the frescoes of painters of the nineteenth century Kraków. The high altar, the work of Fontana, is also baroque and rococo style.

The cathedral is a shrine of Our Lady of Graces (Matka Boża Łaskawa). The icon of Blessed Virgin Mary was crowned in 1636, but the silver-gold dress together with many votive offerings, left as thanksgivings, were stolen. It was crowned again in 1872.

References

Roman Catholic cathedrals in Poland
Buildings and structures in Kielce